Johnson bar may refer to:

 Johnson bar, a type of corrugated metal bar used to reinforce concrete
 Johnson bar (vehicle), a hand lever on various vehicles
 Johnson Bar (locomotive), a hand lever on steam locomotives
 Johnson bar, a lever-dolly (similar to a crowbar) for moving heavy apparatus